Edward S. Shihadeh is an American sociologist and criminologist. He is professor and chair of sociology at Louisiana State University (LSU) in Baton Rouge, Louisiana. At LSU, he also coordinates the Crime and Policy Evaluation Research Group, which he co-founded with Matthew Lee in 2005. He began his academic career in mathematical demography, but later became interested in researching crime and deviance as they pertained to urban black communities. He leads a team of researchers at LSU that analyze data from the Baton Rouge Area Violence Elimination (BRAVE), an anti-crime initiative based on Operation Ceasefire.

References

External links
Faculty page
CV

Living people
Louisiana State University faculty
University of Alberta alumni
Pennsylvania State University alumni
American criminologists
Year of birth missing (living people)